Harold Alfred "Mick" Glenister (21 November 1917 – 6 August 2010) was an Australian rules footballer who played with Geelong in the Victorian Football League (VFL).

Notes

External links 

1917 births
2010 deaths
Australian rules footballers from Victoria (Australia)
Geelong Football Club players
Geelong West Football Club players